Roderick Weusthof (born 18 May 1982 in Nijmegen) is a field hockey player from the Netherlands.

Weusthof was part of the Dutch national team for the 2004 Champions Trophy in Lahore where the Dutch won the silver medal. In 2005 in Chennai they won another silver medal at the same event as well as at the European Championships in Leipzig. His first international gold medal was won in Terrassa in 2007 at the Champions Trophy. In addition the next gold medal was at the 2007 European Championships in Manchester, but in between they performed under their standards at the World Championships in Mönchengladbach with only a seventh position. At the Champions League in 2008 in Rotterdam they finished fourth. He also is part of the Dutch team that qualified for the 2008 Summer Olympics and played in the 2012 Summer Olympics were the Netherlands won the silver medal.

References

External links
 

1982 births
Living people
Dutch male field hockey players
Olympic field hockey players of the Netherlands
Field hockey players at the 2008 Summer Olympics
Field hockey players at the 2012 Summer Olympics
Sportspeople from Nijmegen
Olympic silver medalists for the Netherlands
Olympic medalists in field hockey
Medalists at the 2012 Summer Olympics
SCHC players
SV Kampong players
NMHC Nijmegen players
2006 Men's Hockey World Cup players
20th-century Dutch people
21st-century Dutch people